Horace Basil Barlow FRS (8 December 1921 – 5 July 2020) was a British vision scientist.

Life

Barlow was the son of the civil servant Sir Alan Barlow and his wife Lady Nora  (granddaughter of the naturalist Charles Darwin). 

He was educated at Winchester College, and earned an M.D. at Harvard University in 1946.

Barlow was married twice and had seven children and 13 grandchildren.

Barlow died on 5 July 2020, at the age of 98.

Research

In 1953, Barlow discovered that the frog brain has neurons which fire in response to specific visual stimuli. This was a precursor to the work of Hubel and Wiesel on visual receptive fields in the visual cortex. He has made a long study of visual inhibition, the process whereby a neuron firing in response to one group of retinal cells can inhibit the firing of another neuron; this allows perception of relative contrast.

In 1961, Barlow wrote a seminal article where he asked what the computational aims of the visual system are. He concluded that one of the main aims of visual processing is the reduction of redundancy, which has been extended to the efficient coding hypothesis. While the brightnesses of neighbouring points in images are usually very similar, the retina reduces this redundancy. His work thus was central to the field of statistics of natural scenes that relates the statistics of images of real world scenes to the properties of the nervous system.

Barlow also worked in the field of factorial codes. The goal was to encode images with  statistically redundant components or pixels such that the code components are statistically independent. Such codes are hard to find but highly useful for purposes such as image classification.

Awards and distinctions
Barlow was a fellow of Trinity College, University of Cambridge. He was elected a Fellow of the Royal Society in 1969 and was awarded their Royal Medal in 1993. He received the 1993 Australia Prize (along with Peter Bishop and Vernon Mountcastle) for his research into the mechanisms of visual perception, and the 2009 Swartz Prize for Theoretical and Computational Neuroscience from the Society for Neuroscience. He was awarded the first Ken Nakayama Prize from the Vision Sciences Society in 2016.

Family
Barlow was married twice and fathered seven children. In 1954, he married Ruthala Salaman, daughter of M.H. Salaman.  They had four daughters: Rebecca, Natasha, Naomi and Emily. They were divorced in 1970. In 1980, he married Miranda, daughter of John Weston-Smith. They had one son, Oscar, and two daughters, Ida and Pepita. Barlow was the great-grandson of Charles Darwin and thus part of the Darwin — Wedgwood family.

Selected publications
H. B. Barlow. Possible principles underlying the transformation of sensory messages. Sensory Communication, pp. 217–234, 1961
H. B. Barlow. Single units and sensation: A neuron doctrine for perceptual psychology? Perception 1(4) 371 – 394, 1972
H. B. Barlow, T. P. Kaushal, and G. J. Mitchison. Finding minimum entropy codes.  Neural Computation, 1:412-423, 1989.

References

External links
 Horace Barlow (1921–2020). Current Biology, Vol. 30, 16, p. PR907-R910, August 17, 2020.
 List and full text of Horace Barlow publications
Australia Prize Biography of Barlow
 Horace Barlow in Neurotree
 Interviewed by Alan Macfarlane 5 March 2012 (video)

1921 births
2020 deaths
Australian neuroscientists
Australian people of English descent
Australia Prize recipients
Darwin–Wedgwood family
Fellows of the Royal Society
Fellows of Trinity College, Cambridge
Harvard Medical School alumni
Royal Medal winners
Vision scientists
People educated at Winchester College
Younger sons of baronets
20th-century British medical doctors
British expatriates in the United States